Turbonilla atypha is a species of sea snail, a marine gastropod mollusk in the family Pyramidellidae, the pyrams and their allies.

Description
The thick shell is long  and  moderately  slender. The shell grows to a length of 7.5 mm. It is opaque white, tinted with yellow at the sutures and has considerable  lustre. The larger type specimen has 10 flattened whorls on the teleoconch,  having a slight bulge just above  the well marked suture. The transverse ribs number about  20. They are ill-defined, not  reaching quite to the  lower suture. They are broadly rounded, straight, very  oblique, gradually decreasining in prominence as the shell increases, so that on the body whorl they show but faintly. The interspaces are  narrow and shallow. The base of the shell iselongate, well-rounded and smooth. The aperture of the type specimen is badly broken. The inner lip is considerably thickened and reflected.

Distribution
This species occurs in the Atlantic Ocean off Brazil and Uruguay.

References

External links
 To Biodiversity Heritage Library (3 publications)
 To Encyclopedia of Life
 To World Register of Marine Species

atypha
Gastropods described in 1899